Abudi (also Romanized as ‘Abūdī) is a village in Salami Rural District, Khanafereh District, Shadegan County, Khuzestan Province, Iran. At the 2006 census, its population was 2,776, in 447 families.

References 

Populated places in Shadegan County